Errol Gaston Hill (5 August 1921 – 16 September 2003) was a Trinidadian-born playwright, actor and theatre historian, "one of the leading pioneers in the West Indies theatre". Beginning as early as the 1940s, he was the leading voice for the development of a national theatre in the West Indies. He was the first tenured faculty member of African descent at Dartmouth College in the United States, joining the drama department there in 1968.

Career
Hill was an actor and announcer with the British Broadcasting Corporation in London, and subsequently went to teach at the University of West Indies, in Kingston, Jamaica, and Port-of-Spain, Trinidad, as creative arts tutor (1953–58 and 1962–65). Between 1958 and 1966 he was also working as a playwright. He was a teaching fellow at the University of Ibadan, Ibadan, Nigeria (1965–67), and then an associate professor of drama at Richmond College of the City University of New York, 1967–68. He was a professor at Dartmouth College in Hanover, New Hampshire, from 1968 to 1989. After 1972 he devoted himself to scholarship and writing. 
His early work focused on creating a body of plays uniquely suited for audiences and actors in the West Indies. His later published work brought to light the many accomplishments and trials of black stage actors.

Hill's works include the play Man Better Man (1964) and the non-fiction books The Trinidad Carnival (1972), The Theater of Black Americans (1980), and the Cambridge Guide to African and Caribbean Theatre (1994). He also wrote some poetry, published in anthologies and regional literary journals.

Selected bibliography
 The Ping-Pong and Broken Melody (1958). UWI Extra-Mural Department, Mona.
 Man Better Man in J. Gassner (ed.), The Yale School of Drama Presents (1954), New York: Dutton.
 Wey-Wey: Strictly Matrimony: The Square Peg (1966). UWI Extra-Mural Department, St Augustine.
 Trinidad Carnival (1972). University of Texas Press.
 A Time and a Season – Eight Caribbean Plays, ed. (1976). Carifesta and UWI Extra-Mural Department, Mona.
 The Theater of Black Americans (1980), Prentice-Hall.
 The Jamaican Stage, 1655–1900 (1992), University of Massachusetts Press.
 Cambridge Guide to African and Caribbean Theatre, ed. (1994)
 A History of African American Theatre, ed. with James V. Hatch (2003), Cambridge University Press. .
 Shakespeare in Sable: A History of Black Shakespearean Actors (April 1986), University of Massachusetts Press.

Notes

External links
The Papers of Errol Hill at Dartmouth College Library.

Dartmouth College faculty
1921 births
2003 deaths
20th-century male writers
 Trinidad and Tobago dramatists and playwrights
20th-century dramatists and playwrights
Alumni of RADA
Category by: Trinidad and Tobago male writers
 Trinidad and Tobago expatriates in the United States
 Trinidad and Tobago expatriates in Jamaica
 Trinidad and Tobago expatriates in the United Kingdom